Chorea is an abnormal involuntary movement disorder.

Chorea or Choreia may also refer to:
 Choreia, an ancient Greek dance
 Chorea minor
 Chorea gravidarum, a chorea that occurs as a complication in pregnancy

See also
 Choreoathetosis, a combination of chorea and athetosis
 
 Cholera, an infection of the small intestine by some strains of the bacterium Vibrio cholerae
 Corea (disambiguation)
 Correa (disambiguation)
 Correia, a Portuguese surname
 Korea (disambiguation)